Snake Valley is a north-south trending valley that straddles the Nevada–Utah border in the central Great Basin. It is bound by the Snake Range and the Deep Creek Mountains to the west and the Confusion Range to the east. The valley is the gateway to Great Basin National Park and Lehman Caves, which are located in the western part of the valley and on the southern Snake Range.

People
Though it is relatively isolated from civilization today, the human presence in Snake Valley goes back 12,000 years. The oldest accessible evidence of this is the Baker Archeological Site, a Fremont culture habitat maintained by the BLM. 

Current communities in the valley include Baker in Nevada and Garrison, Burbank, Eskdale, Callao, Partoun, Trout Creek, Gandy, and Border in Utah. Today, the main industries in the valley are farming and ranching, especially sheep ranching.

Water

Snake Valley is noted for a water project involving the Las Vegas Valley, that would target the underlying Basin and Range Carbonate Aquifer, an aquifer that supplies local agriculture and is a relatively large source of water for this region. Though Snake Valley and the surrounding area is arid and part of the Great Basin Desert, the (relatively) high ranges like the Snake Range, Deep Creek Mountains, and the Schell Creek Range allow a large snowpack that recharges the regional aquifer. This 'additional' water manifests itself in the many springs, wetlands, and lakes that make Snake Valley surprisingly lush. Thus, Snake Valley has long been a target of wildlife and farmers, with at least one farm (Dearden Ranch in Burbank, Utah) in continual operation since the 1880s.

The water development project is proposed by the Southern Nevada Water Authority (SNWA), the water authority that services the Las Vegas area. Local ranchers and environmentalists have objected to this removal of water from local aquifers, comparing the situation to Owens Valley, California and noting local drawdowns and springs drying up allegedly, but indeterminably, from local agricultural pumping, like at Needle Point Springs. Enhanced demand on the water from locals and enhanced hydrogeologic monitoring have occurred as a result of this proposal, including the USGS's BARCASS study and the Utah Geological Survey's Snake Valley Groundwater Monitoring Program. Both studies have generally concluded that precipitation in the high mountains of the area are the source of the far away but anomalously large springs at Fish Springs National Wildlife Refuge. 

Others support the system, noting the importance of the growth and sustainability of the Las Vegas Valley. The largest advocate for the pipeline has been SNWA General Manager Patricia Mulroy. Mulroy has continuously claimed that this water source must be tapped to keep Las Vegas running. Others agree, and have used New York City as an example of proper water management. New York has relied on water from the Catskills and Hudson Valley region for more than a century, and due to proper management, these ecosystems continue to flourish, despite the allocation of the water in the Catskills and Hudson Valley.

References

External links

 Protect Snake Valley Blog
 An NPR story on water issues in Snake Valley and Las Vegas

Valleys of Utah
Valleys of Nevada
Landforms of Juab County, Utah
Valleys of Millard County, Utah
Valleys of White Pine County, Nevada
Valleys of the Great Basin